Sindhekela is a village in Balangir district in the Koshal region of the Western Odisha, India. This is comes under Sindhekela Gram Panchayat.

Transport
Near by Titilagarh railway station is a junction on the Jharsuguda–Vizianagaram line and Kantabanji railway station Raipur–Vizianagaram line. Through this it is connected to all major cities of India. It was one of the major railway stations in the Sambalpur railway division under East Coast Railway Zone.
There is a state highway SH-42 between Sindhekela and Balangir district via Kantabanji which also connected with SH-16 and MDR-13 between Sindhekela to Titilagrh.Historical Place Ranipur Jharial is known as "Soma Tirtha" in scriptures is near Sindhekela. It combines a section of religious faiths like Saivism, Buddhism, Vaisnavism and Tantrism. The circular open vault enclosure of sixty-four yoginis, the major attraction of the place, is one of the four such shrines in India. The temple of Someswar Siva is the noted one among the approximately 50 temples here. The brick temple of Indralath is said to be the tallest brick temple of Odisha. Distance 100 km from Dist. HQ Communication Road Rail - Nearest station- Kantabanji Lodging and Boarding Kantabanji.Tributaries of the Tel, Sundar river is situated near Sindhekela.

Education
 Pallishree Junior Mahavidyalaya, Sindhekela
 Pallishree High School, Sindhekela
 Govt.(Boys) Primary School, Sindhekela
 Govt.(Girls) UP School, Sindhekela
 Govt. Nodal Upper Primary School, Sindhekela
 Saraswati Shishu Mandir, Sindhekela
 J.M.D. English Medium School, Sindhekela
 B.R Ambedkar English Medium School, Sindhekela

Notable people
 Dilip Ratha-CEO, KNOMAD – World Bank

References

Balangir district